Nilceu Aparecido dos Santos (born July 14, 1977, in Cascavel) is a Brazilian professional racing cyclist for the DataRo-Bottecchia team.

Career highlights

2001
 1st – Prova Ciclística 9 de Julho (BRA)
2002
 3rd – Copa América de Ciclismo (BRA)
 Stage 2 and 5 wins – Volta do Rio de Janeiro (BRA)
2004 – Memorial-Santos
 1st – Prova Ciclística 9 de Julho (BRA)
 Stage 3 – Tour de Santa Catarina (BRA)
2005 – Scott–Marcondes Cesar–São José dos Campos
 1st – Copa América de Ciclismo (BRA)
 Stage 1 – Volta de São Paulo (BRA)
 2nd –  National Championship, Road, Elite, Brazil (BRA)
 3rd – Prova Ciclística 9 de Julho (BRA)
 2nd overall GC – Volta Do ABC Paulista (BRA)
 2nd – Copa da Republica de Ciclismo (BRA)
2006 – Scott–Marcondes Cesar–São José dos Campos
 1st – Copa América de Ciclismo (BRA)
 Stage 2 – Volta Ciclistica de Porto Alegre (BRA)
 Stage 9 – Volta de São Paulo (BRA)
 1st – Prova Ciclistica 1° de Maio – GP Ayrton Senna (BRA)
 Stage 1, 8, 9 and 10 wins – Tour de Santa Catarina (BRA)
2007 – 
 1st – Copa América de Ciclismo (BRA)
 1st overall GC and Stage 2, 3 and 4 wins – Torneio de Verão (BRA)
 Stage 5 – Volta do Rio de Janeiro (BRA)
 Stage 1 – Volta de São Paulo (BRA)
  National Championship, Road, Elite, Brazil (BRA)
 Stage 1 – Tour de Santa Catarina (BRA)
 1st – Copa da Republica de Ciclismo, Elite/U23 (BRA)
2008 – 
 1st – Copa América de Ciclismo (BRA)
2009 – 
 2nd – Copa América de Ciclismo (BRA)
2014
 1st Stage 8 Tour do Brasil

External links

1977 births
Living people
Brazilian male cyclists
Brazilian road racing cyclists
People from Cascavel
Sportspeople from Paraná (state)